Victoria Bridge is the early 20th century lattice girder bridge over the River Dee at Mar Lodge on Mar Lodge Estate, Aberdeenshire, Scotland. This bridge, built in 1905 and replaced an earlier wooden bridge, built in 1848 by the Duke of Leeds during his tenancy of the estate. The archway at the south end of the bridge bears '1848 Queen Victoria 1848' on the south side and '1905 Edward VII 1905' commemorating the construction of both bridges and the reigning monarch at the time.

Description
Built in 1905, Victoria Bridge is classed as a Category B structure.

Victoria Bridge crosses the River Dee linking the drive to Mar Lodge with the public road between Braemar and Linn of Dee.

At the public road end there is a gate and a gate house that was occupied by a Gatekeeper when Mar Lodge Estate was owned by the Duffs.

Gallery

See also
 Places, place names, and structures on Mar Lodge Estate

References

Buildings and structures on Mar Lodge Estate
Places and place names on Mar Lodge Estate
Listed bridges in Scotland
Category B listed buildings in Aberdeenshire
Road bridges in Scotland
Bridges in Aberdeenshire
Bridges across the River Dee, Aberdeenshire